George Edwin Bryant (1862 – 26 November 1943) was an Australian actor in the silent era. Between 1913 and 1936 he acted in eleven film roles, including starring roles in The Sick Stockrider and Moondyne.

Bryant died in his home in South Yarra, Victoria on 26 November 1943 he was 81.

Filmography

References

Specific

1862 births
1943 deaths
Australian male silent film actors
20th-century Australian male actors